"Maybe" is a song written by Enrique Iglesias, Steve Morales, Kara DioGuardi, and David Siegel for Iglesias' second English-language album, Escape (2001). Iglesias stated in many interviews that the song was his favorite track from the album Escape. In 2002, the album was reissued with two new tracks, one of which was a reworking of the song dubbed the "Mark Taylor Mix". This version changed the song from a rhythmic piano based ballad into a slower guitar-driven song. This version of the song was released as the fifth single from the album.

"Maybe" caused minor controversy when Britney Spears debuted a new song during her Dream Within a Dream Tour called "My Love Was Always There", which features similar lyrics to the chorus of Iglesias's "Maybe" as well as the same melody throughout the song. The single was released on 18 November 2002, reaching number one in Romania and becoming a top-40 hit in Ireland, the Netherlands, New Zealand, and the United Kingdom.

Track listings

European CD single
 "Maybe" (Mark Taylor mix)
 "Maybe" (album version)

UK CD1
 "Maybe" (Mark Taylor's mix)
 "Hero" (from The One and Only)
 "Maybe" (from The One and Only)
 "Maybe" (CD-ROM video)

UK CD2
 "Maybe" (Mark Taylor's Mix)
 "La chica de ayer" (album version)
 "Love to See You Cry" (from The One and Only)

UK cassette single
 "Maybe" (Mark Taylor mix)
 "Hero" (from The One and Only)

Australian CD single
 "Maybe" (Mark Taylor mix)
 "Maybe" (album version)
 "Don't Turn Off the Lights" (Fernando Garibay & Giorgio Moroder remix edit)
 "La chica de ayer" (album version)
 "Don't Turn Off the Lights" (video)

Credits and personnel
Credits are lifted from the Escape album booklet.

Studios
 Recorded at Larrabee Studios (North Hollywood, California) and Hit Factory Criteria (Miami, Florida)
 Mastered at Bernie Grundman Mastering Studio (Hollywood, California)

Personnel

 Enrique Iglesias – writing, vocals, co-production, vocal production
 Steve Morales – writing, background vocals, production, vocal production
 Kara DioGuardi – writing, background vocals, vocal production
 David Siegel – writing, keyboards
 Aaron Fishbein – acoustic and electric guitar
 Lee Levin – drums
 Dave Way – mixing
 Shane Stoner – engineering
 Fabian Marasciullo – engineering
 Marc Lee – assistant engineering
 Ivy Skoff – production coordination
 Brian Gardner – mastering

Charts

Weekly charts

Year-end charts

Release history

See also
 List of Romanian Top 100 number ones of the 2000s

References

2001 songs
2003 singles
Enrique Iglesias songs
Interscope Records singles
Number-one singles in Romania
Songs written by David Siegel (musician)
Songs written by Enrique Iglesias
Songs written by Kara DioGuardi
Songs written by Steve Morales